Thioacetamide is an organosulfur compound with the formula C2H5NS.  This white crystalline solid is soluble in water and serves as a source of sulfide ions in the synthesis of organic and inorganic compounds.  It is a prototypical thioamide.

Research
Thioacetamide is known to induce acute or chronic liver disease (fibrosis and cirrhosis) in the experimental animal model. Its administration in rat induces hepatic encephalopathy, metabolic acidosis, increased levels of transaminases, abnormal coagulopathy, and centrilobular necrosis, which are the main features of the clinical chronic liver disease so thioacetamide can precisely replicate the initiation and progression of human liver disease in an experimental animal model.

Coordination chemistry
Thioacetamide is widely used in classical qualitative inorganic analysis as an in situ source for sulfide ions.  Thus, treatment of aqueous solutions of many metal cations to a solution of thioacetamide affords the corresponding metal sulfide:
M2+  +  CH3C(S)NH2  +  H2O   →   MS  +  CH3C(O)NH2  +  2 H+  (M = Ni, Pb, Cd, Hg)
Related precipitations occur for sources of soft trivalent cations (As3+, Sb3+, Bi3+) and monovalent cations (Ag+, Cu+).

Preparation
Thioacetamide is prepared by treating acetamide with phosphorus pentasulfide as shown in the following idealized reaction:
CH3C(O)NH2  +  1/4 P4S10   →   CH3C(S)NH2  +  1/4 P4S6O4

Structure
The C2NH2S portion of the molecule is planar;  the C-S, C-N, and C-C distances are 1.68, 1.31, and 1.50 Å, respectively. The short C-S and C-N distances indicate multiple bonding.

Safety
Thioacetamide is carcinogen class 2B.

It is known to produce marked hepatotoxicity in exposed animals. Toxicity values are 301 mg/kg in rats (LD50, oral administration), 300 mg/kg in mice (LD50, intraperitoneal administration). This is evidenced by enzymatic changes, which include elevation in the levels of serum alanine transaminase, aspartate transaminase and aspartic acid.

References

 

IARC Group 2B carcinogens
Thioamides
Hepatotoxins